The 2005 Speed World Challenge season was the 16th season of the Sports Car Club of America's World Challenge series.  The series' title sponsor was television network Speed Channel, who broadcast all the races. Championships were awarded for grand touring and touring cars.  The season began on March 18 and ran for eleven rounds. Andy Pilgrim and Cadillac won the championships in GT, and Peter Cunningham and Acura won in Touring Car.

Schedule

References

GT World Challenge America
Speed World Challenge